The Laredo Formation is a geologic formation and Lagerstätte in Texas, United States and Nuevo León and Tamaulipas, Mexico. It preserves fossils dating back to the Lutetian stage of the Eocene period. Among many other fossils, the formation has provided invertebrates, vertebrates, leaves, pollen and spores and fossil wood of the brackish water palm Nypa sp.

See also 
 List of fossiliferous stratigraphic units in Mexico
 List of fossiliferous stratigraphic units in Texas
 Paleontology in Texas

References

Bibliography 
  

Geologic formations of Mexico
Geologic formations of Texas
Eocene Series of North America
Paleogene Mexico
Paleogene geology of Texas
Lutetian Stage
Sandstone formations
Shale formations
Limestone formations
Sandstone formations of the United States
Shale formations of the United States
Limestone formations of the United States
Shallow marine deposits
Lagerstätten
Fossiliferous stratigraphic units of North America
Paleontology in Mexico
Paleontology in Texas